Snowed Under is a 1936 American romantic comedy film directed by Ray Enright and starring George Brent as a playwright who is working under a tight deadline. He becomes snowed-in in his remote cabin with two ex-wives and a girlfriend, played by Genevieve Tobin, Glenda Farrell and Patricia Ellis.

Plot summary

Cast
 George Brent as Alan Tanner
 Genevieve Tobin as Alice Merritt ex-wife #1
 Glenda Farrell as Daisy Lowell ex-wife #2
 Patricia Ellis as Pat Quinn
 Frank McHugh as Orlando Rowe
 John Eldredge as McBride
 Porter Hall as Arthur Layton
 Helen Lowell as Mrs. Canterbury
 Mary Treen as Miss. Jones (uncredited)
 Shirley Lloyd as Blonde who answered telephone (uncredited)

References

External links
 
 
 
 

American romantic comedy films
American black-and-white films
Films about writers
Films directed by Ray Enright
Warner Bros. films
1936 romantic comedy films
1936 films
Films with screenplays by F. Hugh Herbert
1930s English-language films
1930s American films